Sebastián Merchán (born 2 December 1987 in Cuenca) is an Ecuadorian racing driver. He has competed in such series as Euroseries 3000 and the Italian Formula Renault Championship.

References

External links
 
 

1987 births
Living people
People from Cuenca, Ecuador
Ecuadorian racing drivers
Italian Formula Renault 2.0 drivers
Italian Formula Three Championship drivers
Formula 3 Euro Series drivers

Latin America Formula Renault 2000 drivers
Lamborghini Super Trofeo drivers